Nosferatu the Vampire is a rock opera musical by Bernard J. Taylor inspired by the 1922 silent movie classic by Friedrich Wilhelm Murnau.

It was first recorded as a concept studio recording with singers including Peter Karrie, Claire Moore, Barry James (the West End's longest-running Thénardier in Les Misérables), Mario Frangoulis (Raoul in The Phantom of the Opera, 1988–89, 1991), Simon Burke and others.

It received its world premiere at the Madison Theatre, Peoria, Illinois in 1994, followed by a production at the Hippodrome, Eastbourne, England, shortly afterwards. 
The opera/musical has since been translated into German, Spanish and Hungarian and was due to receive its Continental European premiere in Budapest in October, 2007.

References

Larkin, Colin; John Martland (1999). The Virgin Encyclopedia of Stage and Film Musicals. London: Virgin in association with Muze UK Ltd. .

External links
Nosferatu the Vampire, Bernard J. Taylor website

1994 musicals
Musicals based on films
Nosferatu
Rock operas
Vampires in music
Vampires in plays